The 2000–01 New Zealand Figure Skating Championships was held at the Paradice in Botany Downs, Auckland from 18 through 20 September 2000. Skaters competed in the disciplines of men's singles and ladies' singles across many levels, including senior, junior, novice, adult, and the pre-novice disciplines of juvenile, pre-primary, primary, and intermediate.

Senior results

Men

Ladies

Ice dancing

External links
 2000–01 New Zealand Figure Skating Championships results

2000 in figure skating
New Zealand Figure Skating Championships
Figure Skating
September 2000 sports events in New Zealand